Alland may refer to:

In people:
 Sandra Alland (born 1973), an Edinburgh Scottish-Canadian writer, multimedia artist, bookseller, small press publisher
 William Alland (1916 - 1997), an actor, producer, writer and director

In places:
 Alland, a town in the district of Baden in Lower Austria in Austria